Pain is the second studio album by The Ohio Players, and their debut for the Westbound label.

History
After recording an album for Capitol Records in 1968, the group had split up.  Some of the members decided to take a chance once more and it led them to Armen Boladian, whose Westbound label in Detroit was the then-home of George Clinton and his band Funkadelic.  The group recorded "Pain" and was released as a single.  Positive feedback lead to Boladian signing them for a full contract, making the band record enough material for their Westbound debut.

The group still has some of the vocal and musical qualities found on their Capitol material, but their first work in the 1970s showed them incorporating a bit of jazz and a harder yet polished soulful sound.

A number of things were established with this album.  The romantic and sexy aspects of their music started with Pain, with songs devoted to their love of women.  It would become one of their trademarks throughout their career.  The group would also become known for their suggestive photos on the album covers.  The group would also present a character in the form of a grandmother who was simply known as Granny, voiced by Walter "Junie" Morrison.  Granny and her stories would remain with the group until Junie left the group in 1974, the year the Ohio Players signed with Mercury.

When the album was released, the original mono mix of "Pain" was used.  In 2018, the very first stereo mix of Pain emerged.  It was featured on a 1/4" mastertape from the Nashville recording sessions in May 1971, before the move to Westbound.  The Ohio Players were still signed to Top Hit Records at that point. The Nashville tape contains 6 songs, including 2 songs that ended up on the "Pain" LP: "(If You Were) My Woman" and the very first stereo mix of "Pain". All songs on the Nashville tape were mixed by Bud Billings at Music City Recorders in Nashville.  The mixes are different from the later releases on Westbound, in that the stereo field is wider and the sound is drier with less reverb.  The Westbound album was engineered by Arlen Smith who also engineered Pleasure and Funkadelic's America Eats Its Young.

Track listing

Personnel
Gregory Webster
Walter "Junie" Morrison
Leroy "Sugarfoot" Bonner
Marshall "Rock" Jones
Ralph "Pee Wee" Middlebrooks
Bruce Napier
Marvin Pierce
Clarence Satchell
Some tracks feature singer Dale Allen. According to drummer Greg Webster, Allen joined the group after being recommended by Bootsy Collins, but was fired from the band after a heated argument with Clarence Satchell in the studio during the third day of recording the album.

Production
Ohio Players, Herb James, Billy Pittman – producers
Bob Scerbo - production supervision
Ohio Players – arrangement
Joel Brodsky – photography

Charts

Singles

References

External links
 Pain at Discogs

1972 albums
Ohio Players albums
Westbound Records albums
Albums with cover art by Joel Brodsky